Michael Te-pei Chang (born February 22, 1972) is an American former professional tennis player and coach. He is the youngest man in history to win a singles major, winning the 1989 French Open at 17 years and 109 days old. Chang won a total of 34 top-level professional singles titles, (including seven Masters titles) was a three-time major runner-up, and reached a career-best ranking of world No. 2 in 1996. Since he was shorter than virtually all of his opponents, he played a dogged defensive style utilizing his quickness and speed.

In 2008, Chang was inducted into the International Tennis Hall of Fame. He has coached Kei Nishikori since 2014.

Early life
After moving from Hoboken, New Jersey, to St. Paul, Minnesota, where Michael learned tennis, the Changs moved first to Placentia, California, and then Encinitas, California, to increase the tennis opportunities for Michael and his older brother, Carl. Growing up Chang learned some Chinese from his Taiwanese parents and can speak Mandarin. Betty quit her job as a chemist to travel with Chang on the tour. After rising to #163 in the world as a 15-year-old amateur, Chang dropped out of tenth grade at San Dieguito High School in Encinitas after passing his GED in February 1988 in order to pursue a professional tennis career.

Chang also attended the master's in ministry program at Biola University in La Mirada, California, for a year and a half. He serves on Biola's Board of Trustees.

Tennis career

Chang first came to the tennis world's attention as an outstanding junior player who set numerous "youngest-ever" records. He won his first national title, the USTA Junior Hard Court singles, at the age of 12. Aged 13, he won the Fiesta Bowl 16s. Two years later, aged 15, Chang won the USTA Boys 18s Hardcourts and the Boys 18s Nationals, and became the youngest player to win a main draw match at the US Open when he defeated Paul McNamee in four sets in the first round. A month later he reached the semifinals at Scottsdale, Arizona to become the youngest player to reach the semifinal stage of a top-level professional tournament. He won his first top-level singles title in 1988 at San Francisco, aged 16 years and 7 months.

He defeated Stefan Edberg in a five-set final, 6–1, 3–6, 4–6, 6–4, 6–2. His victory is equally remembered for an epic five-set encounter with Ivan Lendl in the fourth round (see below). Chang became the first American man to win the French Open since Tony Trabert in 1955, and the first American man to win a Grand Slam since 1984. And in August 1989, Chang became the youngest player to be ranked in the world's top 5.

Chang met Edberg in the semifinals of the US Open in 1992, this time Edberg winning in a five-set encounter, 6–7, 7–5, 7–6, 5–7, 6–4. The 5-hour, 26-minute match is the longest in US Open history. Chang reached three further Grand Slam finals after his 1989 French Open triumph, losing the 1995 French Open final to Thomas Muster, the 1996 Australian Open final to Boris Becker, and the 1996 US Open final to Pete Sampras. In the 1995 French Open, he defeated Michael Stich and then two-time defending champion Sergi Bruguera in the semifinals in straight sets, eventually losing to Muster. In both the 1996 Australian and U.S. Opens, he defeated Andre Agassi in the semifinals in straight sets; a win over Sampras at the U.S. Open would have made Chang the no. 1 player in the world. In the 1997 U.S. Open, he was the odds-on favorite to win after Sampras was upset by Petr Korda; however, Chang lost to eventual champion Patrick Rafter in the semifinals in straight sets.

Chang was a key member of the US team which won the Davis Cup in 1990. In the semifinals at Austria, his dramatic comeback from two-sets down against Horst Skoff, 3–6, 6–7, 6–4, 6–4, 6–3, led the US into its first Davis Cup final since 1984. Chang went on to defeat Darren Cahill in straight sets, as the US defeated Australia in the final. He was also on the US team which won the World Team Cup in 1993. His best performance in the year-end singles championship came in 1995, when he defeated Muster, Jim Courier, and then dominated Pete Sampras in the semifinals, before losing in the final to Boris Becker.

Chang represented the US in the 1992 Summer Olympics in Barcelona, reaching the second round before being eliminated by Jaime Oncins. He chose to skip the 1996 Summer Olympics despite the fact that the event was held in Atlanta and that he would have been the tournament's number-one seed (the singles' gold medal was won by Andre Agassi). Chang participated in the 2000 Summer Olympics in Sydney, where he was eliminated in the first round by Sébastien Lareau.

Chang was introduced to tennis by his father Joe, who was his first coach. During his rise in 1989 (including his French Open title), he was coached by José Higueras. For much of his professional career, he was coached by his older brother Carl Chang, who also played in several doubles tournaments with him in the early 1990s. He was the first player to be beaten by Roger Federer in the main draw of a Grand Slam tournament, at the 2000 Australian Open. He was also the second player to be beaten by Andy Roddick in the main draw of a Grand Slam tournament, in the second round of the French Open in 2001.

Chang retired from the professional tour in 2003. During his career, he won a total of 34 top-level professional singles titles. His final top-level title was won in 2000 at Los Angeles. His total career prize-money earnings was US$19,145,632. His career-high singles ranking was world no. 2 in 1996, following his US Open finals performance. He was a year-end top-ten player for six consecutive years in the 1990s (1992–1997), a feat matched in the decade only by Pete Sampras. He is one of a few players to win ATP titles in three different decades. His three Indian Wells Masters titles was an ATP record which stood for 15 years, before being eclipsed by Roger Federer in 2012.

Since retiring from the top-level game, Chang has joined Jim Courier's senior tour, which began on March 10, 2006, in Naples, Florida.

Chang became Kei Nishikori's coach in 2014.

1989 French Open match vs Ivan Lendl
Chang's most famous match took place at the 1989 French Open, on the way to winning his only Grand Slam singles title. Chang defeated Eduardo Masso, Pete Sampras and Francisco Roig, dropping only one set, in reaching the fourth round. There, Chang faced World No. 1, reigning Australian Open champion, and three-time former French Open champion Ivan Lendl. 

In 1988, Chang had been easily beaten by Lendl in an exhibition match held in Des Moines, Iowa. After the match, Lendl advised Chang, "First off, you've got no serve. And you've certainly got no second serve. You can't hurt me. You can run but you better develop a weapon to survive out here", all weaknesses that Chang worked to improve on.

Lendl appeared to be on the way to victory after taking the first two sets 6–4, 6–4, and then breaking Chang's serve in his opening service game of the third set. However, Chang broke back immediately and went on to claim the third set, 6–3. During the fourth set, Chang experienced a severe attack of leg cramps, and though he won the set to level the match, he considered retiring from the match while up 2–1 in the fifth set. He later said that he felt "an unbelievable conviction in my heart" not to give up, and decided to finish the match.

Chang paced the sidelines during changeovers as he risked not being able to get up if he sat down, and ate bananas and drank water at every opportunity. He also adopted some unusual tactics in an attempt to overcome his cramps such as hitting the ball high into the air on many points to slow the game down (known as "moon balls"), and began to go for more winners in order to shorten the points.  The success of these tactics caused Lendl, known to be one of the least easily fazed players, to lose his rhythm and also prompted him to swear at the umpire and the crowd, especially after losing a key point in the fifth set when Chang shocked him by delivering an under-arm serve.

Chang continued to suffer from cramps, but managed to take a 5–3 lead in the fifth set with two match points on Lendl's serve. Aiming to break Lendl's concentration one more time, Chang stood just behind the service line while waiting to receive Lendl's second serve. The crowd started laughing at the bizarre situation and Lendl seemed to think everyone was mocking him. The tactic worked, as Lendl produced a double-fault to give Chang the victory, 4–6, 4–6, 6–3, 6–3, 6–3, in 4 hours and 37 minutes. Chang sank to his knees and broke down in tears at the conclusion of the match. 

Lendl afterwards remarked on his loss to Chang, "Lots of times a lesser player could beat me and not back it up. You'd have to say he was a lesser player then, but Michael backed it up."

Chang subsequently defeated Ronald Agénor in the quarter-final and Andrei Chesnokov in the semi-final. Then seven days after his match against Lendl, after beating Stefan Edberg in five sets, Chang went on to lift the Coupe des Mousquetaires, becoming the youngest men's champion in Grand Slam history. Chang's match against Lendl was played on June 5, 1989, just one day after the height of the Tiananmen Square Massacre. Chang has frequently noted the impact of the massacre when recalling his French Open victory:
  

Chang would defeat Lendl again in near-duplicate fashion, 2–6, 4–6, 6–4, 7–6 (7–5), 9–7 in a 4-hour, 42-minute semi-final match at the Grand Slam Cup on December 14, 1991.

Business ventures
Chang and his family established CMCB Enterprises, which has real estate holdings including shopping malls, in California, Texas, Arizona and Colorado. In 2003, they bought Dunton Realty Co., a retail brokerage and property management company, and changed its name to Dunton Commercial Real Estate Co. In 2004, they bought SullivanHayes Cos., a retail real estate company in Denver. It was chosen by Denver International Airport to develop a new 17-acre retail project along Peña Boulevard, the airport's main artery.

Equipment and endorsements
Chang signed a multimillion-dollar endorsement deal with Reebok in 1988; he wore Reebok apparel and Reebok Court Victory Pumps shoes during his tennis career and used Prince rackets on court. He started using the Prince "Precision Michael Chang Graphite" 28-inch signature racket in 1994, which was an inch longer than the standard model.

Chang signed endorsement deals with Nissin Foods noodles in 1989, Panasonic and Longines in the 1990s, Cathay Pacific Airlines in 1990, Bristol-Myers Squibb promoting Nuprin in 1991, Stelux watches in 1993, Discover Card in 1996, Tiger Balm, Procter & Gamble (endorsing P&G's Rejoice Shampoo), Eveready Battery Company (endorsing Eveready Alkaline batteries), and Yale locks. In 1997, he signed a multi-year contract to endorse Watch Reebok, a collection of sports watches. A limited edition Michael Chang signature watch was released at Christmas.

Public image
Chang's success marked the start of an era in which a new generation of American players—which also included Pete Sampras, Jim Courier, and Andre Agassi—would come to dominate the game.

Charity work
Chang served as Chairman of ATP Tour Charities in 1994. He has supported grassroots tennis development in Asia through his Stars of the Future program in Hong Kong and the Reebok Challenge across Asia. He was one of five athletes named in the second annual "Most Caring Athlete" list by USA Today Weekend in 1995. In 1997, he was given one of seven Asian-American leadership awards by A Magazine for his status as a role model for Asian-American youth. He has also served as a national spokesman for the National Fish and Wildlife Foundation in the US.

In 2001, Chang served as a goodwill ambassador for the 2008 Beijing Olympic bid committee. 

In 2002, he published a book about his career, Holding Serve: Persevering On and Off the Court.

Personal life
On October 18, 2008, Chang married Amber Liu, also a professional tennis player. They have two daughters. He is a devout Christian.

Awards and recognition
Chang won the ATP Newcomer of the Year award in 1988.

Chang was awarded ATP Most Improved Player in 1989.

On May 3, 2009, Chang was honored by the Los Angeles Chinese Historical Society of Southern California in "Celebrating Taiwanese Americans in Sports".

Significant finals

Grand Slam finals

Singles: 4 (1–3)

Year-end championships finals

Singles: 1 (0–1)

Grand Slam Cup finals

Singles: 2 (0–2)

Masters Series finals

Singles: 9 (7–2)

ATP career finals

Singles: 58 (34 wins, 24 runners-up)

Singles performance timeline

1 Held as Stockholm Masters until 1994, Stuttgart Masters from 1995 to 2001.

Top 10 wins

Records 

 Youngest Grand Slam champion, winning French Open, at 17 years, 3 months old (1989).
 Youngest Grand Slam finalist, playing French Open final, at 17 years, 3 months old (1989).
 Youngest ever male player to be ranked ATP top-5, at 17 years, 5 months old (1989).
 Youngest ever male player to be ranked ATP top-5 at the end of the season, at 17 years, 10 months old (1989).
 Youngest ever male player to be ranked ATP top-10 at the end of the season, at 17 years, 10 months old (1989).

References

Further reading
 Michael Chang: Tennis Champion (1993) by Pamela Dell 
 Holding Serve Persevering On and Off the Court (June 4, 2002) by Michael Chang, Mike Yorkey

External links

 
 
 
 
 
 bio – file interview with Michael Chang
 A Chinese interview (in Simplified Chinese)
 Text and Audio of Michael Chang's Tennis Hall of Fame Induction Speech

1972 births
American investors
American male tennis players
American memoirists
American real estate businesspeople
American sportspeople of Taiwanese descent
American sportspeople of Chinese descent
American writers of Chinese descent
Businesspeople from California
Businesspeople from New Jersey
French Open champions
Grand Slam (tennis) champions in men's singles
International Tennis Hall of Fame inductees
Living people
Olympic tennis players of the United States
People from Encinitas, California
Sportspeople from Hoboken, New Jersey
Sportspeople from Orange County, California
Sportspeople from Saint Paul, Minnesota
Sportspeople from the New York metropolitan area
Taiwanese-American tennis players
Tennis people from California
Tennis people from New Jersey
Tennis players at the 1992 Summer Olympics
Tennis players at the 2000 Summer Olympics